Nemmeli is an agricultural village in Madukkur Panchayat Union, Pattukkottai taluk of Thanjavur district, Tamil Nadu, India, also known as 28.Nemmeli. Nemmeli village is division of Musugundha Nadu in Chola nadu. It comes under Pattukottai legislative constituency and Tanjore Parliament constituency. It is a small and well developing Village located in southern part of Tamil Nadu. It is 15 km from Pattukkottai and Mannargudi. It is surrounded with number of villages. Being in the Cauvery River Delta Area the inhabitants’ main occupation is agriculture. The younger generation is well educated and they working Various Location in India and also in foreign countries like Singapore, Malaysia, UAE, Saudi Arabia, UK and USA. Many people's working in foreign countries Like Saudi Arabia, Singapore, UK, USA, etc. The economy is booming in line with India’s rapid economic development. Nemmeli Seawater Desalination Plant located in the township is a major drinking water supply source for South Chennai since 2010.

Tamil is the official language and is predominantly spoken.

Demographics 

As per the 2001 census, Nemmeli had a total population of 1147 with 580 males and 567 females. The sex ratio was 978. The literacy rate was 71.1.

This village People formed a translocal forms of citizenship amongst members of the Neighboring Villages in Singapore, London and many other countries. Like all transnational communities involved in the production of locality, identity and social viability, these villagers now based in Singapore (immigrant city-state consisting of a diverse ethnic population with the Indians making up the third major group), maintain strong social and cultural ties with their villages in South India.

Major cultivation

Thanjavur is known as the "Rice bowl of Tamil Nadu". Paddy is the crops and the other crops grown are Blackgram, Banana, Coconut, Gingelly, Ragi, Red gram,Green gram, Sugarcane and Maize. The total percentage of land fit for cultivation is 58%. There are three seasons for agriculture in Thanjavur - Kuruvai (June to September), Samba (August to January) and Thaladi (September, October to February, March).but due to lack of water resources maximum area should be planted by coconut trees.

Paddy and Coconut are the major crops cultivated by Nemmeli peoples.

 Paddy (நெல்),
 Groundnut (கடலை),
 Sugarcane (கரும்பு),
 Black Gram (உளுந்து),
 Coconut etc...

Facilities

There is One Government Primary School which is Known as ஊராட்சி ஒன்றிய தொடக்க பள்ளி, located in south street.
The village have a Library.

Temples

There are 6 Major Temples located in this Village, They are,
 1. Vinayagar Temple, 
 2. Mazhai Muthu Marriyamman Temple,
 3. Kamatchi Amman, Kaluvadiyaan Temple,
 4. Sivan Temple,
 5. Ayyanar Temple.
 6. Anjaneyar Temple
 7, phechyyamman temple

Festivals
1. Vaigasi Vishagam, 
2. Mazhai Muthu Mariyamman Kovil Thiruvizha

During the Tamil Month of "Vaigasi" in every year people celebrating "Vaigasi Vishagam" with full of happiness. The people pray the Goddess and tie a pole with ropes attached for carrying on shoulder gifts to a temple (KAVADI). This function is called as "KAVADI YEDUTHAL". In this Festival all the peoples comes from various place and meet together and tribute to god.

Sports

KABBBADI, CRICKET, VOLLEY BALL is an important sport's to the people of Nemmeli.
  
There are various inter-village, as well as "Kabaddi " tournaments held in Nemmeli every year.

Political Views

Member of Legislative Assembly c.v. sekar  (AIADMK,)- MLA of Pattukottai.
Member of Parliament - K.Parasuraman - AIADMK - Thanjavur(Lok Sabha constituency)
Councillor - M. Sekar (AIADMK, Keelakurichi)

Nenmeli is a part of the Thanjavur Lok Sabha constituency
Most of the peoples are supporters of AIADMK,DMK and INC Congress.

Transport
Bus Routes:
There is no direct Bus routes to reach Nemmeli. But From Pattukkotai or Mannargudi get down in Nemmeli road Bus Stop \n and 1 km walkable distance can reach the Village.

From Mannargudi; Get Pattukkottai Bus (Via Vadaseri) next stop to Vadaseri.
From Pattukkottai; Get Mannargudi bus (Via Vadaseri) Next stop to Kodiyaalam.

Famous Places Near By:
 In Mannargudi, Rajagopalaswamy temple is the most prominent landmark in Mannargudi.
 In Pattukkotai, Sri Puradhana Vaneswarar temple is the most important Hindu temple in Pattukkottai
 In Vadaseri, there is a famous Temple named as Kamatchi Amman Temple.

Among Radio channels, All India Radio's Tiruchirapalli AM station and FM channels like Kodai Rainbow FM and FM channels of Tiruchirapalli and Karaikal are popular.

Climate 

As basically India is a tropical country, This village is very hot in summer season (April, May, June, July) and the rainy season lies in three months October, November, December. As this village is located in Tanjore district, a coastal district in Tamil Nadu state, this village receives about 80% of total annual rainfall in rainy season thanks to the North-East monsoon blowing from the Bay of Bengal.  The Bay of Bengal is just  from this village in Adirampattinam town.

References 

 

Villages in Thanjavur district